"We Were in Love" is a song written by Chuck Cannon and Allen Shamblin, and performed by American country music artist Toby Keith.  It was released in June 1997 as the first single from his album Dream Walkin'.  It peaked at number 2 in both the United States and Canada. The song was originally intended for Faith Hill, who placed it on hold for a short period while recording her 1998 album Faith, as reported by Keith on ''After MidNite with Blair Garner.

Content
The narrator wishes that he could build a time machine, and go back to when he and his lover were 17, and when they were in love.

Music video
This was the first Toby Keith video that Michael Salomon directed, who has since directed the majority of his music videos. It premiered on CMT on June 13, 1997, when CMT named it a "Hot Shot".

Chart positions
"We Were in Love" debuted at number 61 on the Hot Country Singles & Tracks chart for the week of June 14, 1997.

Year-end charts

References

1997 singles
Toby Keith songs
Songs written by Allen Shamblin
Songs written by Chuck Cannon
Music videos directed by Michael Salomon
Song recordings produced by James Stroud
Mercury Nashville singles
1997 songs